2001 in Russian football saw the ninth title for FC Spartak Moscow and the fourth Cup for FC Lokomotiv Moscow. The national team qualified for the 2002 FIFA World Cup.

National team
Russia national football team qualified for the 2002 FIFA World Cup by finishing first in the UEFA group 1.

 Russia score given first

Key
 H = Home match
 A = Away match
 F = Friendly
 WCQ = 2002 FIFA World Cup qualifying, UEFA Group 1

Leagues

Top Division

First Division
Shinnik Yaroslavl and Uralan Elista returned to the Top Division after occupying two top positions First Division. Uralan were back immediately after relegation in 2000.

Vitaliy Kakunin of Neftekhimik became the top goalscorer with 20 goals.

Second Division
Of six clubs that finished first in their respective Second Division zones, three play-off winners were promoted to the First Division:

Cup
The Russian Cup was won by Lokomotiv Moscow, who beat Anzhi Makhachkala 4–3 on penalties after the final ended 1–1.

UEFA club competitions

2000–01 UEFA Champions League
Spartak Moscow qualified for the second group stage of the 2000–01 UEFA Champions League. Spartak finished fourth in group C which also contained FC Bayern Munich, Arsenal F.C., and Olympique Lyonnais.

2000–01 UEFA Cup
Lokomotiv Moscow lost to 0–2 on aggregate to Rayo Vallecano in the third round of the 2000–01 UEFA Cup.

2001–02 UEFA Champions League
Lokomotiv Moscow qualified for the group stage of the 2001–02 UEFA Champions League after defeating FC Wacker Tirol 3–2 on aggregate. This meant that Russia had two teams in the group stage of the Champions League for the first time. Lokomotiv finished third in the group with Real Madrid, A.S. Roma, and R.S.C. Anderlecht.

Spartak Moscow, who qualifiers for the group stage automatically, finished last in a group which also contained FC Bayern Munich, AC Sparta Prague, and Feyenoord Rotterdam, scoring only two points.

2001–02 UEFA Cup
Four Russian clubs played in the 2001–02 UEFA Cup. Chernomorets Novorossiysk, who were struggling in the league, lost both first round matches to Valencia CF (0–6 on aggregate). Torpedo Moscow also failed to progress, losing 2–3 on aggregate to Ipswich Town F.C.

Anzhi Makhachkala's fixture against Rangers F.C. was ordered by UEFA to be played over one leg at a neutral site. The tie was played soon after September 11 attacks, and UEFA decided not to play matches in Makhachkala due to the situation in Chechnya.  Rangers won the match in Warsaw 1–0.

The only club to progress to the second round was Dynamo Moscow, who overcome Birkirkara F.C. 1–0 on aggregate. In the second round Dynamo were beaten 7–2 on aggregate by Rangers.

References
National team fixtures 
League and cup results
UEFA Champions League results: 2000–01 2001–02
UEFA Cup results: 2000–01 2001–02

 
Seasons in Russian football